Sabuton Alber John (born 26 March 1976) is a Saint Vincent-born cricketer who plays for the Turks and Caicos Islands.  John is a right-handed batsman who bowls right-arm medium pace.

John played a single Twenty20 match for the Turks and Caicos Islands against Montserrat in the 2008 Stanford 20/20 at the Stanford Cricket Ground.  He was run out for 7 runs in this match by Lionel Baker, with the Turks and Caicos Islands making just 67 runs in their twenty overs.  Montserrat went on to win the match by 9 wickets.

References

External links
Sabuton John at ESPNcricinfo
Sabuton John at CricketArchive

1976 births
Living people
People from Saint Vincent (Antilles)
Turks and Caicos Islands cricketers
Saint Vincent and the Grenadines emigrants to the Turks and Caicos Islands
Saint Vincent and the Grenadines cricketers